Župa is a settlement in the Municipality of Trbovlje in central Slovenia. It lies in the hills above the right bank of the Sava River east of Dobovec. The area is part of the traditional region of Lower Carniola. It is now included with the rest of the municipality in the Central Sava Statistical Region.

References

External links
Župa on Geopedia

Populated places in the Municipality of Trbovlje